Blaise Antonie Rogeau (born 26 November 1994) is a French field hockey player who plays as a forward for Belgian Hockey League club Waterloo Ducks and the French national team.

Club career
Rogeau was crowned French champions four times with Saint Germain. He left France in 2019 to play for Gantoise in Belgium. After reaching the final of the Belgian championship with Gantoise in 2022 he joined the Waterloo Ducks.

International career

Under–21
Blaise Rogeau debuted for the France U–21 team in 2014, at the EuroHockey Junior Championship in Waterloo.

Les Bleus
Rogeau made his debut for Les Bleus in 2016 during a test series against Wales in Cardiff.

Since his debut, Rogeau has been a regular fixture in the national squad. In 2018 he represented the team at the FIH World Cup in Bhubaneswar. He won his first major medal with the senior team in 2019 at the FIH Series Finals in Le Touquet, taking home a gold medal.

In 2022 he was a member of the French squad in season three of the FIH Pro League.

References

External links
 
 

1994 births
Living people
French male field hockey players
Male field hockey forwards
2018 Men's Hockey World Cup players
La Gantoise HC players
Waterloo Ducks H.C. players
Men's Belgian Hockey League players
2023 Men's FIH Hockey World Cup players